Márcio dos Santos Gaia, commonly known as Santos Gaia, (born 8 September 1978) is a Brazilian footballer from São Mateus who plays as a defender.

Career
Gaia, a defender, holds a Spanish passport (gained through marriage), which means he does not require a work permit to play in England. He signed for English side Exeter City in August 2002. He made 33 League Two appearances during his first season, which saw Exeter relegated from the Football League, however he remained with the club despite the exodus of many other first team members. The 2004–05 season saw him among the club's top scorers, unusually for a defender, with nine goals, all of which were scored in the first half of the season. In January 2005 he played in Exeter's memorable 0–0 draw at Old Trafford in the FA Cup.

On 26 June 2006, Gaia signed a two-year contract with Conference side Stevenage Borough where he was a first-team regular. During his time at Broadhall Way, he was part of the side that defeated Kidderminster Harriers in the 2007 FA Trophy final. He had previously scored an important goal in the semi final against future club Grays Athletic to put his club through to the final. He scored one other goal for Stevenage in a 4–2 defeat to Forest Green Rovers on 25 September 2007.

Santos Gaia signed for Grays Athletic on loan on 22 November 2007 until 1 January 2008, when the deal was made permanent for £10,000.

He signed for Halifax Town on loan until the end of the 2007–08 season, where he made a total of nine Conference National appearances. The defender was released from Grays Athletic at the end of the season along with Nicky Eyre, Danny Knowles, Cameron Mawer and Charley Hearn.

On 20 May 2008, Gaia signed for Weymouth alongside Pierre Joseph-Dubois.

On 26 February 2009, Gaia joined Crawley Town, signing until the end of the season. He scored his first goal for Crawley on 8 March 2009, ironically against former club Weymouth. In June 2009, Gaia turned down a sizeable offer from Rushden & Diamonds and joined Cornish side Truro City instead.

Honours
FA Trophy: 2007

References

External links

1978 births
Living people
Naturalised citizens of Spain
Brazilian footballers
Brazilian expatriate footballers
Association football defenders
Pontevedra CF footballers
Exeter City F.C. players
Stevenage F.C. players
Grays Athletic F.C. players
Halifax Town A.F.C. players
Weymouth F.C. players
Crawley Town F.C. players
English Football League players
National League (English football) players